Mount Nelson, can refer to:
 Mount Nelson (Alberta)
 Mount Nelson (Antarctica)
 Mount Nelson (British Columbia), see list of highest mountain peaks of Canada
 Mount Nelson, Tasmania
 Belmond Mount Nelson Hotel, a luxury hotel in Cape Town, South Africa
 Mount Nelson (horse), a Thoroughbred racehorse